Kim Hyo-joo (born 14 July 1995), also known as Hyo Joo Kim, is a South Korean professional golfer who plays on the LPGA of Korea Tour. She won the 2014 Evian Championship while setting the record for lowest 18-hole score at a major with a 61 in the first round. The 2014 Evian Championship was her first major appearance. She later accepted membership on the LPGA Tour for 2015.

Professional wins (21)

LPGA of Korea Tour wins (14)

LPGA of Japan Tour wins (1)

LPGA Tour wins (5)

LPGA Tour playoff record (0–1)

Other wins (1)

Major championships

Wins (1)

Results timeline
Results not in chronological order before 2019.

CUT = missed the half-way cut
T = tied

Summary

 Most consecutive cuts made – 8 (2019 PGA – 2022 Chevron)
 Longest streak of top 10s – 2 (twice)

LPGA Tour career summary

^ Official as of 21 July 2022
*Includes matchplay and other tournaments without a cut.

World ranking
Position in Women's World Golf Rankings at the end of each calendar year.

^ as of 27 February 2023

Team appearances
Amateur
Espirito Santo Trophy (representing South Korea): 2012 (winners)

References

External links

Kim Hyo-joo at the KLPGA Tour official site 

Profile on Seoul Sisters site

South Korean female golfers
LPGA of Korea Tour golfers
LPGA Tour golfers
Winners of LPGA major golf championships
Olympic golfers of South Korea
Golfers at the 2020 Summer Olympics
Sportspeople from Gangwon Province, South Korea
People from Wonju
1995 births
Living people
21st-century South Korean women
20th-century South Korean women